Cue sports have a long history in India. The game of snooker originated among British Army officers stationed in India in the latter half of the 19th century.

Billiard champions like Wilson Jones, Michael Ferreira, and Geet Sethi have come out of India. Pankaj Advani is another successful Indian player. Training camps for identifying talent and providing them regional and state sponsorship have been organised by the Billiards and Snooker Federation in various parts of the country.

History
The origin of snooker dates back to the latter half of the 19th century. In the 1870s, billiards was a popular activity amongst British Army officers stationed in India and several variations of the game were devised during this time. One such variation originated at the officers' mess of the 11th Devonshire Regiment in 1875, which combined the rules of two pocket billiards games, pyramid and black pool. The former was played with fifteen red balls positioned in a triangle, while the latter involved the potting of designated coloured balls. The game developed its own identity in 1884 when its first set of rules was finalised by Sir Neville Chamberlain, an English officer who helped develop and popularise the game at Stone House in Ooty on a table built by Burroughes & Watts that was brought over by boat. The word "snooker" was a slang term for first-year cadets and inexperienced military personnel, but Chamberlain would often use it to describe the inept performance of one of his fellow officers at the table. The name instantly stuck with the players.

The earliest contemporary reference to cue sports in India appears in a letter written by Captain Sheldrick from Calcutta on 2 February 1886. The letter gives a detailed account of a game called "Snookers". The letter also contains references to the game being played among members of the British Indian Army in 1884. British officer Ian Hamilton, who was stationed in Ooty from 1882–84, wrote a letter in 1938 in which he noted, "I have never doubted that my old friend Sir Neville Chamberlain invented the game of Snooker. I was in at Ootacamund in 1882-84 and there still must be some crowd left who can testify to the belief their current that Snooker owed its birth to Neville Chamberlain fertile brain. Could the game have existed in Ooty even before Chamberlain arrival just waiting for him to discover it and give it a new name. This is a certainly a possibility." The Billiards and Snooker Federation of India (BFSI) states that Ooty is "the most credible birthplace for the game of Snooker", however, the federation rejects the theory that the game was already established in Ooty. The BSFI also states that, based on available evidence, the first snooker game in India occurred at Ooty "almost precisely" in December 1881.

Total medals won by Indian's in Cue Sports in Major tournaments

Performance by Players in Billiards Tournaments

Performance by Players in Snooker Tournaments

References

 
Sport in India by sport